Ante Zurak  (born 13 August 1984) is a Croatian former professional footballer who played as a centre-back.

Playing career 
Zurak played in the Croatian First Football League in 2002 with NK Zadar. In 2006, he signed with NK Međimurje, where he appeared in 47 matches. He went abroad in 2008 to sign with Alta IF in the Norwegian First Division. After a season in Norway he played with NK Široki Brijeg in the Premier League of Bosnia and Herzegovina. In 2010, he was loaned to Toronto Croatia of the Canadian Soccer League. He later went abroad to Asia to play with Mes Sarcheshmeh F.C., and Turan-Tovuz IK. In 2012, he returned to Croatia to play with HNK Primorac Biograd.

References

External links
 

1984 births
Living people
Sportspeople from Zadar
Association football defenders
Croatian footballers
NK Zadar players
NK Međimurje players
Alta IF players
NK Široki Brijeg players
Toronto Croatia players
Mes Sarcheshme players
NK GOŠK Gabela players
Turan-Tovuz IK players
HNK Primorac Biograd na Moru players
Croatian Football League players
Norwegian First Division players
Premier League of Bosnia and Herzegovina players
Canadian Soccer League (1998–present) players
Persian Gulf Pro League players
Azerbaijan Premier League players
Croatian expatriate footballers
Croatian expatriate sportspeople in Norway
Expatriate footballers in Norway
Croatian expatriate sportspeople in Bosnia and Herzegovina
Expatriate footballers in Bosnia and Herzegovina
Croatian expatriate sportspeople in Canada
Expatriate soccer players in Canada
Croatian expatriate sportspeople in Iran
Expatriate footballers in Iran
Croatian expatriate sportspeople in Azerbaijan
Expatriate footballers in Azerbaijan